Aeroclub Manitoba or Ciudad Cuauhtémoc Airfield is a small private airport operated by Aero Club Manitoba S.A. de C.V. and is located 28 kilometers (17 milles) north of Ciudad Cuauhtémoc, Chihuahua. It has 5,413 feet long by 57 feet wide runway, a 176,528 sq ft platform, 2 taxiways and hangars. Currently it is only used for general aviation purposes and is the headquarter of the Manitoba Aviation School.

Accidents and incidents 
 On July 23, 2019, a Piper PA-30-160 Twin Comanche aircraft with registration XB-OYB owned by the Manitoba Aeroclub Aviation School that was making a private flight between the Aeroclub Manitoba Airfield and Durango Airport, crashed into an agricultural field Shortly after taking off in the municipality of Cuauhtémoc, Chihuahua, killing the pilot and the 3 passengers.

References

External links 
Aeroclub Manitoba in PilotNav

Airports in Chihuahua (state)